The Aluara Bronzes or Aluara Hoard represent a rare and important set of Jain images found in Aluara near Dhanbad region of Bihar, in Eastern India.

History 
These bronze images dedicated to Jain tirthankaras that dates back to 11th century. They are currently kept in Patna Museum for preservation.

Major Idols 
The idol of Kunthunatha, the 17th tirthankara was found in padmasan posture with symbol of goat punched into the simhasan (pedestal).

The image of Ambika, the protector goddess of the 22nd tirthankara, Neminatha, standing in tri-bhanga posture with her two sons and lion mount.

Other well-known hoards of Jain bronzes include Akota Bronzes, found in Gujarat; Vasantgarh hoard, found in Vasantgarh; Hansi hoard, found in Haryana; and Chausa hoard, found in Bihar.

See also 
 Vasantgarh hoard
 Akota Bronzes
 Chausa hoard
 Hansi hoard
 Lohanipur torso

References

Citation

Sources 
  
 

Sculptures in India
Jain sculptures